Itameshi is a type of fusion cuisine originally from Japan that combines traditional elements of Japanese food and Italian food. The name comes from the combination of the Japanese name for Italy and the Japanese word for meal.

History
The concept of this fusion first started in the 1920s when spaghetti was first introduced to Japan when it was served in small cafes. Italian food wouldn't gain a bigger foothold in the country until the 1990s when the Asia financial crisis hit and many upscale restaurants were affected with the low wages and increased prices. Many of these restaurants and chefs turned to Italian food as a cheaper alternative and from there, Italian food became even more popular in the country.

Overseas popularity
The popularity of this specific fusion food has taken off in the United States with many different cook books and videos highlighting these dishes gaining popularity online. This popularity has even led to the opening of restaurants specifically dealing in Itameshi within the country.

See also

Naporitan
Yōshoku
Korean-Mexican fusion

References

Japanese fusion cuisine
Italian fusion cuisine